This is a list of Power Rangers episodes. Power Rangers is adapted from the 45-year-long line of Japanese tokusatsu television series known as Super Sentai. Over 900 episodes have aired since Mighty Morphin Power Rangers premiered in 1993, with the 942nd episode being the premiere of the 29th season, Power Rangers Dino Fury (season 2), on March 3, 2022.

Series overview

 — These are the networks where the new episodes for those seasons first aired. Other networks that reran the broadcasts of new Power Rangers episodes a few weeks or months later for those seasons, such as ABC (most seasons), ABC Family (most seasons) or Nicktoons are not included.

List of episodes

Seasons 1–15 (1993–2008)

Season 16–present (2009–present)

Power Rangers specials
This section indexes the official specials that aren't considered part of the normal episode count.

Television specials

Direct to video

References

External links

Power Rangers